José Ortiz de la Renta (c. 1765 – c. 1850) was Mayor of Ponce, Puerto Rico, from 1812 to 1814, 1815 to 1816, 1820 to 1821, 1823 to 1826, 1837 to 1838, 1842 to 1843, 1843 to 1844, and in 1846. He has the distinction of having held the office of mayor of Ponce the most — eight times. He was an hacendado.

Background
Like José Casimiro Ortíz de la Renta and Francisco Ortíz de la Renta, José Ortiz de la Renta was a descendant of the founders of San Germán, on the hills of Santa Marta, next to Río Guanajibo, in 1573.<ref>Francisco Lluch Mora. Orígenes y Fundación de Ponce, y otras noticias relativas a su desarrollo urbano, demográfico y cultural (Siglos XVI-XIX). San Juan, Puerto Rico: Editorial Plaza Mayor. Segunda Edición. 2006. p. 39.</ref> He was an hacienda owner and in 1827 owned 16 slaves.

First mayoral term (1812)
As Ponce has had a municipal council since 1812, Mayor Ortiz de la Renta was the first mayor of Ponce with a legislative council.  José Ortiz de la Renta was the first alcalde constitutional elected by popular vote, in 1812, as a result of the Constitución de Cádiz (Cádiz Constitution). During his first mayoral term, Ortiz de la Renta was mayor from 1 January 1812 to 31 December 1813. His deputy mayor was Joaquin Mercado, and the regidores in the municipal council were: Juan Gonzalez, Pedro Vazquez, Santiago Suarez, Juan Ramon Quintana, Miguel Ortiz de Mathos, Antonio Ortiz de la Renta, Jose Antonio Collazo, and Clemente del Toro.

Second mayoral term (1815)
During his second mayoral term, Ortiz de la Renta was mayor from 1 January 1815 to 2 January 1816. He led the municipality in the capacity of Teniente a guerra.

Third mayoral term (1820)
During his third mayoral term, Ortiz de la Renta performed again as an alcalde constitucional.In 1820, the first known division of the Ponce territory into barrios took place.Barrios de Ponce.  Antepasados Esclavos.(From: Pedro Tomás de Córdoba. Memorias geográficas, históricas, económicas y estadísticas de la Isla de Puerto Rico.) Retrieved 19 June 2012.  During his third mayoral term, Ortiz de la Renta was mayor from the moment José de Toro left the mayoral administration sometime after 3 June 1820 until 31 December 1820.

Ortiz de la Renta's third mayoral term coincided with Ponce's second ayuntamiento. The ayuntamiento was composed of Ortiz de la Renta as mayor (in the role of Alcalde constitucional); Gregorio Medina (Alcalde segundo); Regidores were: Fernando Gandia, Antonio Algarra, Juan Pablo Aponte, José Pica, Domingo Clavell, Antonio González, Antonio Vazquez Zayas, Juan José Quintana; and Síndicos Procuradores were: Benito Paz Falcón and Esteban Dros.

Fourth mayoral term (1823)
During his forth mayoral term, Ortiz de la Renta performed as alcalde propietario. However, little is known about this period as there are no Acts in the Municipality for the period 1824 to 1834, affecting the period while he was mayor as well.

On 10 March 1823, the barrios of Cayabo and Caonillas, which on that date were still part of the municipality of Ponce, ceased to be part of Ponce and became part of Juana Diaz, and later, in 1917, formed their own municipality, Villalba.

In July 1825, there is a revolt in Ponce by slaves due to the large number of slaves that were up for sale, but the revolt failed. During his fourth mayoral term, Ortiz de la Renta was mayor from 1 January 1823 to 31 December 1825.

Fifth mayoral term (1837)
During his fifth mayoral term, Ortiz de la Renta performed as an alcalde. During this term he was mayor from 1 January 1837 to 31 December 1837.

Sixth mayoral term (1842)
During his sixth mayoral term, Ortiz de la Renta performed as alcalde. During this term, Ortiz de la Renta was mayor from 6 January 1842 to 31 December 1842.

Seventh mayoral term (1843)
During his seventh mayoral term, Ortiz de la Renta performed again as alcalde propietario. During this term, he was mayor from the day when mayor Juan Rondon left city hall in 1843 until 31 December 1843.

Eighth mayoral term (1846)
During his eighth mayoral term, Ortiz de la Renta performed again as alcalde.  During this eighth and last mayoral term, he mayored from 1 April 1846 to 30 June 1846.

Honors
Ortiz de la Renta is honored at Ponce's Park of Illustrious Ponce Citizens.  Of over 100 Ponce mayors, only six are honored there. In Ponce there is a street in Urbanizacion Las Delicias of Barrio Magueyes named after him.

See also

List of mayors of Ponce, Puerto Rico
List of Puerto Ricans

Notes

References

Further reading
 Fay Fowlie de Flores. Ponce, Perla del Sur: Una Bibliográfica Anotada. Second Edition. 1997. Ponce, Puerto Rico: Universidad de Puerto Rico en Ponce. p. 243. Items 1231 and 1232. 
 Ramon E. Miranda Torres. "Don Jose Ortiz de la Renta en la Historia de Ponce." Dialogo.'' Diciembre 1986-Enero 1987. page 28.
 Ramon E. Miranda Torres. "Don Jose Ortiz de la Renta en la Historia de Ponce." Tesis de Maestría (In Spanish). San Juan, Puerto Rico: Centro de Estudios Avanzados de Puerto Rico y el Caribe. 1986. (Archivo Histórico de Ponce, AHP / Centro de Estudios Avanzados de Puerto Rico y el Caribe, CEAPRC / Colegio Universitario Tecnológico de Ponce, CUTPO)

Mayors of Ponce, Puerto Rico
Burials at Panteón Nacional Román Baldorioty de Castro
Year of birth uncertain
Year of death uncertain